Henri De Wolf (17 August 1936 – 12 January 2023) was a Belgian cyclist.

Major results

1959
1st Stage 9 Peace Race
1960
3rd Kuurne-Brussels-Kuurne
5th Tour of Flanders
5th Paris–Roubaix
8th Liège–Bastogne–Liège
1961
1st Stage 7 Critérium du Dauphiné Libéré
2nd GP Isbergues
2nd Grote Prijs Stad Zottegem
1962
1st La Flèche Wallonne
1st Stage 1a Tour of Belgium
1963
1st Stage 1 Four Days of Dunkirk
1st Druivenkoers Overijse
1st Paris-Valenciennes
1964
1st Stage 10 Vuelta a España
1967
2nd Sassari-Cagliari

References

1936 births
2023 deaths
Belgian male cyclists
Belgian Vuelta a España stage winners
People from Deinze
Cyclists from East Flanders